Choi Hye-jin (born 21 September 1982) is a South Korean diver. She competed in the women's 10 metre platform event at the 2000 Summer Olympics.

References

1982 births
Living people
South Korean female divers
Olympic divers of South Korea
Divers at the 2000 Summer Olympics
Place of birth missing (living people)
Divers at the 2002 Asian Games
Asian Games competitors for South Korea
21st-century South Korean women